In cricket, a five-wicket haul (also known as a "fifer") refers to a bowler taking five or more wickets in a single innings. This is regarded as a notable achievement, and as of September 2014 only 42 bowlers have taken 15 or more five-wicket hauls at the international level.
Mitchell Johnson—a left-arm fast bowler—is a former Test, One Day International (ODI) and Twenty20 International (T20I) cricketer who represented Australia. Johnson took 264 wickets in Test matches, 212 wickets in ODIs and 38 wickets in T20Is. With 15 five-wicket hauls across all formats of the game, he ranks equal thirty-ninth among all-time combined five-wicket haul takers, and ninth in the equivalent list for Australia.

Johnson made his Test debut against Sri Lanka in 2007. His first five-wicket haul came against New Zealand during the first Test of the 2008–09 series at the Gabba. His 5 wickets for 39 runs in the second innings raised his tally to 9 wickets for the match. Australia won the match by 149 runs and his performance earned him the man-of-the-match award. His best bowling figures for an innings are 8 wickets for 61 runs against South Africa in 2008. In Test matches, Johnson was most successful against England, taking 5 of his 12 five-wicket hauls against them.

In 2005, Johnson made his ODI debut against New Zealand. He took his first five-wicket haul against India in 2007. Johnson took 5 wickets for 26 runs in the match, which Australian won by 9 wickets. His career best figures are 6 wickets for 31 runs against Sri Lanka at Pallekele International Cricket Stadium in 2011. Although Johnson made his first T20I appearance in 2007, he did not pick up a fifer in the format. Figures of 3 wickets for 15 runs against Sri Lanka in 2010 were his best in this version of the game.

Tests

One Day Internationals

Notes

References

Australian cricket lists
Lists of international cricket five-wicket hauls by player